The term Sous-Sherpa translates as “under Sherpa.” Sherpas are the Nepalese porters that help climbers in the Himalayas. Experts say when used in the context of the G8 or G20 summit the term “Sous-Sherpa” most likely refers to the hefty work load these senior officials undertake in preparation for the summit.

In the United States, the Under Secretary of State for Economic, Energy and Agricultural Affairs (E) traditionally serves as the G8 Foreign Affairs Sous-Sherpa (FASS).  Currently Josette Sheeran holds this position. In this role the Under Secretary assists the U.S. Sherpa, Deputy National Security Advisor David McCormick, who is the principal U.S. official charged with preparing the yearly Summit.  FASSs from the eight countries and the European Commission meet approximately four or five times each year.  G8 Sherpas have a similar schedule.  The FASS role necessarily involves following up both within the U.S. government and with our G8 partners on previous years’ commitments to ensure appropriate action is being taken.

See also
 Sherpa (G8)

Sources
 Sous-Sherpa
 Finance Deputy Minister Announces G-7 Deputy and Finance Sous-Sherpa

G7 summits
Diplomacy